Lac La Biche is a hamlet in Lac La Biche County within northeast Alberta, Canada. Previously incorporated as a town, Lac La Biche amalgamated with Lakeland County to form Lac La Biche County on August 1, 2007.

Etymology
The indigenous peoples of the area referred to the lake as Elk Lake (Nêhiyawêwin: wâwâskesiwisâkahikan, Dënesųłiné: tzalith tway). The earliest Europeans translated this name into English as "Red Deer Lake" and in French as "Lac la biche" ("Lake of the doe"). Over time, the French name came to be used in English as well.

History

Historic voyageur highway 
Lac La Biche was on the historical voyageur route that linked the Athabaskan region to Hudson Bay. David Thompson and George Simpson used the fur trade route via the Beaver River from the main Methye Portage route that reached the Athabasca River. Thompson was the first known European to record his sojourn on Lac La Biche. Thompson, who referred to the lake as Red Deers Lake, arrived October 4, 1798 and overwintered there. He entered copious notes in his diary on the Nahathaway (the Cree), their customs, traditions, and the Western Forest Land, including the large supply of whitefish and beaver.

Fur trade posts
Although the Montreal-based North West Company was already active in the area, Thompson established the first permanent settlement in Lac La Biche on his 1798 trip, a Hudson's Bay Company trading post  which he named Red Deers Lake House. In 1799, Peter Fidler arrived in the area after Thompson's departure, and as the post. This new structure was known as Greenwich House. It was also abandoned by 1801, but Lac La Biche was established as a permanent place of residence for some French-Canadian and Métis freetraders and their families. Fur trade activity continued unbroken, due to the importance of the portage, and Lac La Biche was visited by fur traders such as Gabriel Franchère and Ross Cox. David Thompson returned in 1812.

Another temporary Hudson's Bay Company post was erected in 1817, but the portage was abandoned by the company in 1825. Almost no written records exist for the following two decades.

Oblate mission

A Roman Catholic mission was established in 1853 by Oblate missionaries. Historian Paul Robert Magocsi notes how the settlement grew over the next few decades:

The Lac La Biche Mission is now a National Historic Site and Provincial Historic Resource. It was the site of one of the first residential schools in Alberta.

Treaties and insurrection
The Government of Canada sought to extinguish the First Nations' title to the land across the prairies, in order to open the land up to settlement. Treaty 6 was negotiated in 1876 and covered the lands to the south of Lac La Biche.

The new Hudson's Bay Company post at Lac La Biche was looted on April 26, 1885 during the North-West Rebellion by members of Big Bear's band. Their plan to loot the nearby Roman Catholic Mission was stopped by the local Cree and Métis population. Métis Scrip Records show many residents of the area were awarded scrip by the Government of Canada from 1885 until the 1920s.

Treaty 8, covering the lands north of Lac La Biche, was negotiated in 1899. This set the stage for rail and settlement.

Demographics 

Lac La Biche County's 2016 municipal census counted a population of 2,682 in Lac La Biche, a  change from its 2013 municipal census population of 2,895.

Economy 
The community is supported by the oil patch, logging, forestry, agriculture, and commercial fishing.

Jamie Davis Towing (featured on the Highway Thru Hell reality show) has an operation in Lac La Biche.

Attractions 

Lac La Biche is home to the Lac La Biche Golf Course, while numerous lakes and campgrounds provide outdoor recreation opportunities in the area, including Lakeland Provincial Park to the east. Lac La Biche County has a small museum  dedicated to sharing the history of the area, it is located in the Jubilee Hall building, beside the recreation grounds where the baseball diamonds, splash park, and green space are also located.

Government 

The Hamlet of Lac La Biche comprises Lac La Biche County's Ward 7. Omer Moghrabi was elected as mayor in 2017, Councillors Lorin Tkachuk and Colin Cote represent Ward 7 on Lac La Biche County Council. Provincially, the community has been represented by every major political party in Alberta history (expand table for details).

Infrastructure 

It features a fully serviced  paved airstrip.

Education 
The main campus of Portage College is located in Lac La Biche.  The college has an ACAC hockey team named the Portage Voyageurs. The team's first season began in the fall of 2008.
Northern Lights School Division No. 69
 Vera M. Welsh Elementary School (K-3)
 Aurora Middle School (4–8)
 J.A. Williams High School (9–12)
 Lac La Biche Off-Campus (8–12)
Other
 Light of Christ Catholic School (Preschool-Grade 11)
 École Sainte-Catherine (K-4)

Media 
Media outlets serving Lac La Biche and area include the Lac La Biche Post weekly newspaper and the Boom 103.5 radio station.

See also 
List of communities in Alberta
List of former urban municipalities in Alberta
List of hamlets in Alberta

References

Sources 

 
 
  This is the full-text diary of David Thompson which includes numerous references to the Nahathaway in general and to the First Nations of the Lac la Biche region in particular. He describes their belief in life after death and consequences on the human soul for crimes and misdeeds.

Designated places in Alberta
Former towns in Alberta
Hamlets in Alberta
Hudson's Bay Company trading posts
Lac La Biche County
Populated places disestablished in 2007